The third government of Viktor Orbán was the Government of Hungary between 6 June 2014 and 18 May 2018. Prime Minister Viktor Orbán formed his third cabinet after his party-alliance, Fidesz and its coalition partner, Christian Democratic People's Party (KDNP) altogether won a qualified majority in the 2014 parliamentary election.

Policy

Immigration

During the 2015 European migrant crisis the government initiated the erection of the Hungary-Serbia barrier to block entry of illegal immigrants. Just like the other Visegrád Group leaders, the government was against any compulsory EU long-term quota on redistribution of migrants.

On 24 February 2016 the prime minister announced that the government would hold a Referendum on whether to accept the European Union's proposed mandatory quotas for relocating migrants. He also said it is "no secret that the Hungarian government refuses migrant quotas" and that they will be campaigning for "no" votes. Orbán argued that the quota system would "redraw Hungary's and Europe's ethnic, cultural and religious identity, which no EU organ has the right to do". On 5 May, after examining the legal challenges, the Supreme Court (Kúria) allowed the holding of the referendum.

In the autumn of that year the no vote won with 3,362,224 votes or 98.36% of the total number of votes.

Free Sunday
Fidesz and the Christian Democratic People's Party (Hungary) has supported the restriction on Sunday shopping ("free Sunday", as they called) for a long time, citing Christian values. Parliament voted on the issue on December 14, 2014 and the law came into effect on March 15, 2015 (a Sunday on which shops would have been closed anyway, the day being a public holiday in Hungary). Public opinion was predominantly against the decision. Three polls done in the spring of 2015 registered an opposition of 64% (Szonda Ipsos), 62% (Medián) 59% (Tárki). By the end of May, according to a poll by Medián, 72% of those polled disliked the new law, even the majority of Fidesz-KDNP voters were against it. Opposition parties and private persons tried to start a public referendum several times. By November 2015 there were 16 such attempts, but none of them were approved, for various bureaucratic reasons, until in early 2016 one of these attempts, initiated by the Hungarian Socialist Party, was finally successful. The government, rather than being forced to hold the referendum (which could have been interpreted as a huge success for the opposition party, even though the law was opposed by the majority of Fidesz voters too) lifted the ban in April 2016.

NGO Law
On 13 June 2017, The Hungarian Parliament Passed a Law Targeting Foreign-Funded NGOs. The law requires civil groups receiving foreign donations above a certain threshold to register as organizations funded from abroad. The law was passed 130 to 44, with 25 abstaining.

Party breakdown

Beginning of term
Party breakdown of cabinet ministers in the beginning of term:

End of term
Party breakdown of cabinet ministers in the end of term:

Members of the Cabinet

Composition
Following the 2014 parliamentary election, Fidesz–KDNP gained 133 seats in the National Assembly. The government majority of the parliament elected Viktor Orbán as a fully-fledged prime minister on 10 May, but his third cabinet formed only 6 June.

The Ministry of Foreign Affairs transformed into the Ministry of Foreign Affairs and Trade, while the Ministry of Rural Development and the Ministry of Public Administration and Justice were renamed to Ministry of Agriculture and Ministry of Justice, respectively. On 17 October 2015, the Ministry of the Prime Minister's Cabinet Office was established. Two ministers without portfolio were appointed in May 2017 and October 2017.

References

General
 

2014 establishments in Hungary
2018 disestablishments in Hungary
Cabinets established in 2014
Cabinets disestablished in 2018
Hungarian governments
Government